Ismailia is a city in north-eastern Egypt. Situated on the west bank of the Suez Canal, it is the capital of the Ismailia Governorate. The city has a population of 1,406,699  (or approximately 750,000, including surrounding rural areas). It is located approximately halfway between Port Said to the north and Suez to the south. The Canal widens at that point to include Lake Timsah, one of the Bitter Lakes linked by the Canal.

History 

Ismailia was founded in 1863, during the construction of the Suez Canal, by Khedive Ismail, after whom the city is named. Following the Battle of Kafr-el-Dawwar in 1882 the British established a base there.

The head office of the Suez Canal Authority is located in Ismailia at the shore of Lake Timsah. It has a large number of buildings dating from British and French involvement with the Canal. Most of these buildings are currently used by Canal employees and officials.

During World War I the British had an air base there and the Battle of Romani took place nearby. Ismailia War Cemetery was designed in 1919 by Sir Robert Lorimer marking the casualties of the battle.

In 1973 the Battle of Ismailia took place in the city.

Government and politics
The Muslim Brotherhood was founded in Ismailia by Hassan al-Banna in March 1928. An underground paramilitary wing was established in the 1940s, primarily to contest the British occupation of Egypt. In the early 1950s, Ismailia hosted the British Military HQ and the Civilian Administration Centre of the Canal Zone. An attack on an Egyptian government building and army barracks manned by auxiliary policemen by a British Army force on 25 January 1952 was a key event leading to the overthrow of King Farouk I later that year and the Egyptian Revolution that followed. British forces pulled out of Ismailia in 1954.

The Eastern Catholic Eparchy 
On 1982.12.17 an Eparchy (Eastern Catholic Diocese) of Ismayliah was established on territory split off from the Coptic Catholic Patriarchate of Alexandria (Alexandrian Rite in Coptic language), which remains its Metropolitan. Its episcopal see is St. Mark's cathedral.

Suffragan Eparchs (Bishops of Ismayliah)
 Athanasios Abadir (17 December 1982 – 25 December 1992, his death), previously Titular Bishop of Appia and Patriarchal Vicar of Alexandria of the Copts (Egypt) (18 May 1976 – 17 December 1982)
 Youhannes Ezzat Zakaria Badir (23 November 1992 – 23 June 1994), later Eparch (Bishop) of Luqsor of the Copts (Egypt) (23 June 1994 – 27 December 2015, his death)
 Makarios Tewfik (23 June 1994 – 29 June 2019, resigned)
 Daniel Lotfy Khella (29 June 2019 – present)

Education

Schools
Ismailia has several public and private schools. They face the same educational problems that schools all around Egypt face. Private tutoring is widely accessible and is almost an unofficial requirement for all students. Two international schools, Manar Language School and Educational Language Complex School (E.L.C) offer American Diploma and IGCSE teaching systems.

Universities
Ismailia is the home of the Suez Canal University, established in 1976 with the help of the Chinese Government to serve the region of Suez Canal and Sinai. Suez Canal University now is one of the fastest growing educational institutions in Egypt with many students studying abroad.

Culture and recreation

Arts and festivals 

Ismailia hosts two important festivals each year. The first is the International Film Festival for Documentaries and Shorts that is held in June. In June 2014, the 17th consecutive festival was organized. The second is the Ismailia International Folklore Arts Festival that is held in September. In this festival folkloric troupes from all around the globe meet in Ismailia, where they perform folkloric dances representing the culture of their countries.

Archaeological Museum 
A major attraction is the Ismailia Museum which was built in 1932. Visitors will find a variety of significant archaeological finds especially from sites in the Ismailia governorate such as Tell el-Maskhuta, from North Sinai, and from Upper Egypt.

Tourism 

Ismailia does get tourists from within Egypt, but is not a major tourism destination for international tourists. The city is approximately a ninety-minute automobile drive from Cairo. From Ismailia it is approximately a four-hour drive to Sharm el-Sheikh in South Sinai. Driving to the Taba Border Crossing at Taba and the Rafah Border Crossing at Rafah are both approximately four-hour drives. The city is also infamous for sidewalks painted in yellow and blue after the original kit colour of Ismaily Sports Club, the local sports team of the governorate

Sports 

Ismailia is home to the third most successful club in Egypt (in the field of Football, Ismaily SC. The club's performance is considered a major political issue, and can tend to dictate the city's mood. The team enjoys brief stints of competition for local and international competition, but its financial situation prevents these stints from extending beyond a few years. The team has won the Egyptian League three times (1967, 1991, 2002), the Egyptian Cup twice (1997, 2000), and the African Cup of Champions Clubs once in 1969 as the first Egyptian and Arab Club team to have won this league.

Climate 
Köppen-Geiger climate classification system classifies its climate as hot desert (BWh).

Notable people
Louis Chedid, French singer and songwriter, son of writer Andrée Chedid and father of Matthieu Chedid was born in Ismailia on 1 January 1948
Claude François, French pop singer and songwriter, born in Ismailia on 1 February 1939
Ali Gabr, footballer
Ragaa Al Geddawy (1934–2020), film actress, model and niece of Taheyya Kariokka
Ahmed Hegazy, footballer
Aura Herzog, First Lady of Israel, wife of former Israeli President Chaim Herzog and mother of current Israeli President Isaac Herzog born in Ismailia on 24 December 1924.
Taheyya Kariokka, Egyptian belly dancer and film actress, born in Ismailia on 22 February 1919
Osman Ahmed Osman, influential Egyptian engineer, contractor, entrepreneur, and politician, born in Ismailia on 6 April 1917

See also

 List of cities and towns in Egypt

References

External links 

 
 Diocese of Ismailia
 
 Short animation festival in Ismailia

 
Governorate capitals in Egypt
Populated places in Ismailia Governorate
Metropolitan areas of Egypt
Suez Canal
Populated places established in 1863
Cities in Egypt
1863 establishments in Egypt